The action of 3 May 1920 was a short single-ship action fought during the Russian Civil War between the French Navy and the Soviet Russia.

Background 
During the Russian Civil War, the French Navy was engaged as part of the Allied Intervention providing assistance to the White faction engaged on the Southern Front. The French Navy suffered a mutiny in 1919 but operations were carried until the end of the conflict.

Action 
According to French sources, the French sloop (avisos) Le Scarpe imprudently advanced into the territorial waters of the red Russia near Novorossiysk during a routine patrol in the Black Sea. The Captain wanted to sail to Nikolaiev to collect information about procuring supplies.
The French ship encountered the Soviet floating battery Krasnaya Zarya near Ochakov; during the subsequent fight she was damaged and surrendered. This happened near the end of the Russian Civil War, and the ship was soon returned.

References

External links

Allied intervention in the Russian Civil War
Battles of the Russian Civil War
Naval battles involving Russia
Naval battles involving France
Naval battles of the Russian Civil War